Robert Palmer (born in 1947 died in 1981) is an alpine skier from New Zealand.

In the 1968 Winter Olympics at Grenoble, he came 42nd in the Downhill but did not finish in the Giant Slalom.

References 
 Black Gold by Ron Palenski (2008, 2004 New Zealand Sports Hall of Fame, Dunedin) p. 106

External links 
 
 

Living people
1947 births
New Zealand male alpine skiers
Olympic alpine skiers of New Zealand
Alpine skiers at the 1968 Winter Olympics